Peaceminusone (stylized as PEACEMINUSONE) is a Korean fashion line founded by G-Dragon and Gee Eun in October 2016. The label produces clothing items such as jackets, tops, hats and shoes, as well accessories, headphones and shoes.

The label has collaborated with various labels and fashion houses, notably, Nike, Vogue, Colette, Chow Tai Fook, Redbull, Mickey Mouse and Giuseppe Zanotti.

Peaceminusone name
The name and logo "Peaceminusone" was first seen on his album Coup d'Etat that was released back in 2013. That is similar to peace sign with one line erased, to show the two letters 'G' and the 'D' that represent G-Dragon as well where the name came as "peace minus one".

History
The brand began its first creative experience with a limited exhibition in 2015 located in the Seoul Museum of Art called peaceminusone: Beyond the Stage. The exhibition was created to show the world that G-Dragon perceives and reflects upon human nature while also showing a perfect utopia as the world "peace" implies. It also brought together both pop culture and modern art with collaborations between various artists and G-Dragon, as well as various items from BIGBANG videos. The exhibition features 200 works of art from 12 domestic and international artists including Michael Scoggins, Sophie Clements and James Clar. The show was held from June 6 to August 23.

In October 2016, G-Dragon released officially online. Started as a streetwear brand that consists of a variety of t-shirts, hats, and accessories. The peaceminusone logo is often seen on these clothes along with the name with a line through it as well as a daisy. In 2017, the brand then start shown in a pop-up store in Seoul, with limited stores popping up around the world including Miami, Osaka, and Hong Kong. This brand has gained worldwide popularity with celebrities like Bella Hadid, Luhan, Fan Bingbing and Angelababy, who were spotted wearing a peaceminusone clothes.

Collaborations
In 2014, G-Dragon started using Peaceminusone name with his collaboration with Chow Tai Fook, releasing his own jewellery collection. The following year Italian luxury footwear designer Giuseppe Zanotti teamed up with G-Dragon for a capsule range of footwear. In 2016 G-Dragon teamed up with Verbal and Yoon Ahn's label Ambush for a capsule collection of denim pieces. In 2017 the brand collaborated with Vogue to do pop-up shop in Seoul, selling limited edition Peaceminusone X Vogue apparel. In the same year they launched collaboration with French retailer Colette which was made available to purchase on his online store.

In 2019, the brand contribution for 'Mickey: The True Original Exhibition' in New York City which commemorates Mickey Mouse's 90th Anniversary. In November of same year, the brand collaborated with Nike to release his Peaceminusone Para-Noise Air Force 1 shoes, G-Dragon became the first Korean singer to do so. The shoes sold out within hours of being released world-wide. GQ Australia named the shoes as the second most valuable sneakers of 2019. The Stute picked them as the ninth best shoes in 2019. The sneaker gained worldwide popularity with celebrities and athletes like Neymar, Mbappé, Trinidad James, Jay Chou and J Balvin spotted wearing them. A second version of Peaceminusone Para-Noise Air Force 1 shoes in white color was released in November 2020 named "Paranoise 2.0". It sold-out immediately after release and was named one of the best and most expensive sneakers in 2020.

In 2021, G-Dragon started his own range of shoes made by Nike that began with the Kwondo1 which is inspired by taekwondo, G-Dragon's legal name "Kwon" and Nike's "Just Do It" slogan.

References

External links
 Official site

Clothing brands of South Korea
South Korean companies established in 2016
Companies based in Seoul